Vanessa Lesnicki (born 16 August 1990 in Brussels), known by her stage name Shay, is a Belgian francophone rapper. After a collaboration with Booba in 2011, she has released many songs, notably a hit with "XCII" on the label 92i. Her debut album Jolie Garce was released on 2 December 2016 and was certified gold. The sophomore album Antidote was released on 10 May 2019. Her style is a combination of hip-hop, rap, trap, urban pop and R&B. She is signed to Capitol Music France.

Early life
Shay was born in Brussels. Her father is Belgian-Polish and her mother is Congolese. She is the granddaughter of singer Tabu Ley Rochereau.

Musical career 
In 2014, Shay joined the 92i label of her mentor Booba and released several singles like XCII and 1200. In early summer 2016, Shay released the first single from her album, entitled PMW, which was certified as platinum. On 7 October 2016, Shay released the music video of the song Biche from her album, which was viewed more than 7 million times. Her song Cabeza was released a few weeks late, and went on to be certified gold. On 17 February 2017, Shay released the music video of her single, Thibaut Courtois, dedicated to the goalkeeper of the Belgium national team with the same name. This song was also certified gold.

In 2018, Shay posted an extract from a track entitled Notif on social networks. She also unveiled her return to the studio with producers Heezy Lee, Junior à la Prod and Le Motif on Instagram. At the same time, Shay also collaborated with Jul on the track Pim Pom, taken from the latter's album Inspi d'ailleurs.

She made her comeback and released the track Jolie on 30 November 2018, accompanied by a video clip directed by Guillaume Doubet. On 11 January 2019, Shay released Cocorico, the second single from her new album, which she had previously announced would be released in 2019. On 22 February 2019, she released the track Notif, accompanied by a video clip that, like the video for Jolie, was directed by Guillaume Doubet. Her second album, Antidote, was released on 10 May 2019. On 1 July, she released the video for the song Liquide, a duet with French rapper Niska. The track was certified gold.

Discography

Albums

Singles

As lead artist 

*Did not appear in the official Belgian Ultratop 50 charts, but rather in the bubbling under Ultratip charts.

Other charted songs 

*Did not appear in the official Belgian Ultratop 50 charts, but rather in the bubbling under Ultratip charts.

As featured artist

Filmography

Television

References

Belgian women rappers
1992 births
Living people
Musicians from Brussels
Belgian people of Polish-Jewish descent
Belgian people of Democratic Republic of the Congo descent